The 2012 Big East football season was the 22nd NCAA Division I FBS football season of the conference that was known as the Big East Conference from its formation in 1979 until July 2013, and ultimately proved to be the last for the conference under the "Big East" name, as well as the last with a full round-robin schedule for conference play. The conference consisted of eight football members: Cincinnati, Connecticut, Louisville, Pittsburgh, Rutgers, South Florida, Syracuse and Temple. In February 2012, the Big East settled a lawsuit with West Virginia University that allowed them to move to the Big 12 Conference effective July 1, 2012.

Conference members began regular-season play on August 30 when Temple hosted Villanova; conference play started September 6 when Cincinnati hosted Pittsburgh. The regular season concluded on December 1. Four teams—Louisville, Rutgers, Cincinnati, and Syracuse—claimed shares of the conference championship. Louisville claimed the league's automatic BCS bowl berth via tiebreakers.

On February 28, 2013, ESPN reported that the conference's seven schools that do not play FBS football, which had announced plans to leave the conference as a bloc no later than July 2015, had reached an agreement to leave in July 2013, and would keep the "Big East" name when they formed a new conference at that time. As a result, the schools that retained the original Big East charter would operate under a new name in the 2013 football season. On April 3, 2013, the remaining schools announced they would operate as the American Athletic Conference (The American).

Previous season
West Virginia, Cincinnati and Louisville were co-Big East Champions with a conference record of 5–2. West Virginia received the conference's automatic bid into the BCS bid by way of tie-breakers. The Mountaineers went to the Orange Bowl and defeated Clemson 70–33 in the game, West Virginia tied or broke eight separate team and individual bowl game records, while the combined 69 points West Virginia and Clemson scored in the first half set another new record.

Four other Big East teams went to bowl games in 2011, finishing bowl play with a record of 3–2 as a conference. Louisville (7–6) lost to NC State in the Belk Bowl. Rutgers (9–4) beat Iowa State 27–17 in New Era Pinstripe Bowl. Cincinnati (10–3) defeated Vanderbilt in the Autozone Liberty Bowl, and Pittsburgh lost to SMU 28–6 in the BBVA Compass Bowl. The three teams not to go to a bowl game were Connecticut (5–7), South Florida (5–7), and Syracuse (5–7).

Preseason

Coaching changes
Two teams have new head coaches for the 2012 season. Paul Chryst replaces Todd Graham at Pittsburgh, Kyle Flood replaces Greg Schiano at Rutgers.

Preseason Poll
The 2012 Big East Preseason Poll was announced at the Big East Media Day in Newport, RI on July 31, 2012

 Louisville – 219 (24 first place votes)
 South Florida – 176 (4)
 Rutgers – 155
 Cincinnati – 139
 Pittsburgh – 131
 Connecticut – 77
 Syracuse – 70
 Temple – 41

Schedule

Week 1

Week off: Cincinnati

Week 2

Week 3

Week off: Temple

Week 4

Week off: Cincinnati

Week 5

Week off: Pittsburgh, Temple, Rutgers, Syracuse

Week 6

Week off: Louisville

Week 7

Week off: South Florida

Week 8

Week 9

Week off: Connecticut

Week 10

Week off: Rutgers

Week 11

Week off: South Florida

Week 12

Week off: Louisville, Pittsburgh

Week 13

Week 14

Going into the final week of the season, Rutgers had clinched at least a share of the Big East title, but it was possible that the season could end with a three-way or a four-way tie for the conference championship. The scenarios were:
 Rutgers would win the title and the Big East BCS berth outright with a win over Louisville on November 29.
 If Louisville won, it would create a three-way tie between the two schools and Syracuse. Cincinnati could then join the logjam atop the conference with a win over UConn on December 1.

The conference's BCS berth would then be decided by tiebreakers. Under Big East rules, the first tiebreaker among three or more teams is head-to-head record among the tied teams, followed by the BCS standings.

A three-way tie would go to the BCS standings, since Louisville, Rutgers, and Syracuse finished 1–1 against one another. In a four-way tie, Cincinnati and Syracuse would be eliminated with 1–2 records against the other three teams, with the BCS berth then going to the higher-ranked team between Louisville and Rutgers. The conference said that Louisville would most likely receive the BCS berth if it defeated Rutgers, and that proved to be the case, with the Cardinals claiming the league's BCS berth.

Week off: Temple, Syracuse

Records against other conferences

Big East vs. BCS matchups

Bowl Games

Players of the week
Following each week of games, Big East conference officials select the players of the week from the conference's teams.

Rankings

Home attendance

Neutral Site Games

Big East Conference Awards

The following individuals received postseason honors as voted by the Big East Conference football coaches.

References